Todd Creek (also known as Todd Creek Village) is an unincorporated community and a census-designated place (CDP) located in and governed by Adams County, Colorado, United States. The CDP is a part of the Denver–Aurora–Lakewood, CO Metropolitan Statistical Area. The population of the Todd Creek CDP was 3,768 at the United States Census 2010. The Todd Creek Village Metropolitan District and the Todd Creek Village Park and Recreation District provide services to the community, which lies in ZIP Code 80602.

Geography

Demographics

As of the 2010 census, there were 3,768 people, 1,248 households, and 1,097 families residing in the CDP. The racial makeup of the CDP was 90.2% White, 0.9% African American, 0.6% Native American, 3.4% Asian, 3.0% some other race, and 2.0% from two or more races. Hispanic or Latino of any race were 11.7% of the population.

There were 1,248 households, out of which 42.6% had children under the age of 18 living with them, 81.7% were headed by married couples living together, 3.2% had a female householder with no husband present, and 12.1% were non-families. 7.1% of all households were made up of individuals, and 2.4% were someone living alone who was 65 years of age or older. The average household size was 3.02, and the average family size was 3.18.

In the CDP, the population was spread out, with 27.1% under the age of 18, 4.7% from 18 to 24, 26.2% from 25 to 44, 34.9% from 45 to 64, and 7.0% who were 65 years of age or older. The median age was 41.0 years. For every 100 females, there were 101.4 males.  For every 100 females age 18 and over, there were 102.4 males.

For the period 2007–11, the estimated median annual income for a household in the CDP was $106,757, and the median income for a family was $107,857. Male full-time workers had a median income of $90,192, versus $53,065 for females. The per capita income for the CDP was $44,574.

See also

Outline of Colorado
Index of Colorado-related articles
State of Colorado
Colorado cities and towns
Colorado census designated places
Colorado counties
Adams County, Colorado
List of statistical areas in Colorado
Front Range Urban Corridor
North Central Colorado Urban Area
Denver-Aurora-Boulder, CO Combined Statistical Area
Denver-Aurora-Broomfield, CO Metropolitan Statistical Area

References

External links

Todd Creek Village Metropolitan District
Todd Creek Village Park and Recreation District
Todd Creek Golf Club
Adams County website

Census-designated places in Adams County, Colorado
Census-designated places in Colorado
Denver metropolitan area